Metal Bridge is a hamlet in County Durham, England, situated a few miles south of Durham. The East Coast Main Line runs directly through Metal Bridge but trains do not stop.

Metal Bridge is situated within the civil parish of Ferryhill.

External links 

Hamlets in County Durham
Ferryhill